Johannes Jansen (1665–1734) was the 35th Mayor of New York City from 1725 to 1726.

Career

Johannes Janszen, thus spelt, appears in the 1703 census of New York, in a household with one woman and four children, two boys and two girls. He may also be the same man as Johannes Janszen Van Rommen.

Jansen was elected a member of the New York General Assembly, representing New York, serving from 1709 to 1711 and 1716 to 1726.

Jansen also served as the 35th Mayor of New York City from 1725 to 1726.

References

1665 births
1734 deaths
18th-century American politicians
American people of Dutch descent
Mayors of New York City
Members of the New York General Assembly